2MASS-GC02, also known as Hurt 2, is a globular cluster at a distance of about 16 thousand light-years from Earth in the constellation Sagittarius. It was discovered in 2000 by Joselino Vasquez together with globular cluster 2MASS-GC01 and a spiral galaxy 2MASXI J0730080-220105, and confirmed by a team of astronomers under the leadership of R. J. Hurt at 2MASS.

The globular cluster 2MASS-GC02 is not in the visible portion of the electromagnetic spectrum, due to interstellar extinction, but was spotted in infrared light. It is located at a distance of 10.4 thousand light years from the center of the Milky Way. Due to its trajectory, it has a negative radial velocity meaning it is approaching the Solar System, but its radial velocity is unclear. The radial velocity was originally put at −238 km/s, but a newer analysis determined it to be −87 km/s; a 150 km/s difference.

References

Further reading
Discovery paper

External links
 

Sagittarius (constellation)
Globular clusters
2MASS objects
?